812 Naval Air Squadron was a Naval Air Squadron of the British Royal Navy's Fleet Air Arm. It was active between 1933 and 1956, and saw service in both World War II and the Korean War.

Service history

First formation

The squadron was first formed on 3 April 1933 aboard the aircraft carrier , then part of the Mediterranean Fleet, by amalgamating No 461 and 462 (Fleet Torpedo) Flights. Originally equipped with the Blackburn Ripon, these were replaced with the Blackburn Baffin in January 1934, with the squadron being the first to be fully equipped with this improved derivative of the Ripon. On 24 November 1936, a cyclone hit Hal Far, destroying three hangars and wrecking seven of the squadron's Baffins. As a result, the squadron was re-equipped with the Fairey Swordfish in December 1936. Apart from a short visit to the UK to take part in the 1937 Coronation Review at Spithead, the squadron remained in the Mediterranean until the outbreak of the war in September 1939. Glorious was then sent to patrol the Indian Ocean, but was recalled to home waters in early 1940, and 812 Squadron was transferred to RAF Coastal Command to take part in mining and bombing operations in the low countries and in the Dunkirk evacuation.

In March 1941 the squadron left Coastal Command to take part in Malta convoy protection duties aboard . In July, aboard , they participated in the attack on Petsamo. After the Ark Royal was torpedoed and sunk on 13 November, the squadron regrouped at Gibraltar. While based at RNAS North Front, late on 30 November the U-boat was spotted by a Fairey Swordfish from No. 812 Squadron FAA and heavily damaged by two bombs dropped by the aircraft. Unable to reach her destination, U-96 made for the port of Saint Nazaire. The squadron received new aircraft equipped with ASV (Air to Surface Vessel) radar, enabling them to sink the U-boat  on the night of 21 December 1941, and to damage five others. The squadron returned to the UK in April 1942 aboard , and were reattached to Coastal Command in September to fly operations over the English Channel. On 18 December 1942, it was amalgamated into 811 Squadron.

First reformation

No. 812 Squadron was reformed on 1 June 1944 at RNAS Stretton (HMS Blackcap) and equipped with the Fairey Barracuda. Returning to the Mediterranean, 13 CAG were based at HMS Falcon at Hal Far, Malta, and flew exercises over Sicily. After the German surrender on 8 May 1945, the group were assigned to serve with the British Pacific Fleet.

The group sailed for Australia aboard Vengeance, and were based at HMS Nabswick (MONAB V) at Jervis Bay from 22 July 1945, where they trained for the planned invasion of Japan. After the Japanese surrender on 8 August, they were temporarily based at Ponam in the Admiralty Islands, before being sent to Hong Kong, arriving at HMS Nabcatcher (MONAB VIII) at Kai-Tak, in October 1945, and remaining there until the end of the year.

No. 812 Squadron was re-equipped with the Fairey Firefly, and returned to Australia in January 1946, where they were based  (MONAB VI) at Schofields, New South Wales, while Vengeance was in dry dock for repairs. In March 1946 Vengeance and her squadrons returned to the UK, via Ceylon, and arrived at RNAS Lee-on-Solent (HMS Daedalus) on 12 August 1946, where 812 Squadron was disbanded.

Second reformation

The squadron was reformed again on 1 October 1946 at RNAS Eglinton (HMS Gannet) in Derry, Northern Ireland, and joined 804 Squadron, flying the Supermarine Seafire, to form the 14th Carrier Air Group. In February 1947, 14 CAG sailed aboard  on a lengthy Far Eastern cruise, eventually returning in December.

In August 1948 the group sailed for the Mediterranean aboard , where Hal Far was used as a shore base.

In March 1951 Glory sailed for Korea, where 812 Squadron flew 852 sorties over the next six months, during which three aircraft were lost and several others damaged by AA fire. After two months based in Australia, Glory returned to Korean operations, where the squadron flew another 689 sorties, with 104 of them flown in one day. In May 1952 the squadron transferred its aircraft to Ocean, and the crews sailed home in Theseus.

In June 1952, the squadron was re-equipped with the Firefly AS.6 at RNAS Anthorn (HMS Nuthatch), and in September sailed aboard  for exercises and a visit to Oslo. In January 1953 the squadron joined Theseus for a cruise, returning to Eagle in June for exercises off northern Scotland. It was disbanded at Eglinton on 20 October 1953.

Third reformation
The squadron was reformed for a third time at Eglinton on 7 November 1955 as an anti-submarine squadron, flying the Fairey Gannet. In April 1956 it sailed to the Mediterranean in Eagle, taking part in visits and exercises before flying home from Malta, and was disbanded on arrival at Lee-on-Solent on 13 December 1956.

References

 
 
 

800 series Fleet Air Arm squadrons